The Essex and Suffolk Border Football League is a football competition based in England. The league has a total of four divisions headed by the Premier Division which sits at step 7 (or level 11) of the National League System. The top club may apply for promotion to Division One of the Eastern Counties League.

All member clubs compete in the Border League Knock-Out Cup. The league is affiliated to the Essex County FA and Suffolk County FA.

History
The league was officially founded in 1911, although the league includes records of the Colchester Borough League (founded 1893) and Colchester & District League (founded 1903) in its history. Founder members of the Border League in the inaugural 1911–12 season included Clacton Town, Colchester Town, West Bergholt and West Mersea. 

Over the last 100 years the league has seen many changes in its status with many clubs progressing to a higher level. The overlying trend has been the migration of the larger clubs and their replacement by smaller clubs with more basic facilities. For much of the last 20 years the Border League has run 4 divisions which included a significant proportion of reserve teams. The league lost several members in 2005–06 when the reserve teams of the Eastern Counties League clubs left for their own competition. There is a high representation of village teams but a new trend has emerged with the acceptance of Barnston from Division Three of the Essex Olympian League and Newbury Forest from the Romford and District Football League in the London Borough of Redbridge.

Member clubs 2021–22
The league has 87 teams spread over six divisions for the 2021–22 season:

Former clubs
Among the clubs that have left the Essex & Suffolk Border Football League to compete at a higher level are:

Brantham Athletic
Brightlingsea Regent
Bury Town
Clacton Town
Coggeshall Town
Colchester Town
Cornard United
Crittall Athletic
Felixstowe Town
Haverhill Rovers
Halstead Town
Harwich & Parkeston
Heybridge Swifts
Holland
Little Oakley
Long Melford
Maldon Town
Saffron Walden Town
Stanway Rovers
Stowmarket Town
Sudbury Town
Sudbury Wanderers
Team Bury
Tiptree United
Whitton United
Witham Town
Wivenhoe Town

List of champions and cup winners

Gallery

References

External links
Official website

 
Football leagues in England
Football in Essex
Football in Suffolk
Sports leagues established in 1911
1911 establishments in England